Ryerson's Island is an island in Ontario, Canada, located in Lake Erie north of Long Point.  The island is named for its first owner, Colonel Joseph Ryerson (1764-1854), who was a Loyalist sniper from New Jersey in a unit that tried to kill George Washington, later serving with the Prince of Wales American Regiment and father of Egerton Ryerson.

References

Islands of Lake Erie in Ontario